Stadion Miejski w Ząbkach (English: Municipal Stadium in Ząbki), officially since 2018 called Dozbud Arena for sponsorship reasons., and Dolcan Arena in the past; is a multi-use stadium in Ząbki, Poland.

It is currently used mostly for football matches and is the home ground of Ząbkovia Ząbki. The stadium holds 2,100 people and was extensively rebuilt to its current look in 2012.

In 2016–2020, Legia Warsaw II played their home matches here, however in 2020 moved to Grodzisk Mazowiecki.

References

Ząbki
Sports venues in Masovian Voivodeship
Wołomin County